Evius venusta is a moth of the subfamily Arctiinae first described by Paul Dognin in 1924. It is found in Brazil and French Guiana.

References

 

Phaegopterina